Brachypalpus cyanogaster, the Bluebottle Catkin, is a rare species of syrphid fly first officially described by Loew in 1872  Hoverflies get their names from the ability to remain nearly motionless while in flight The  adults are also known as flower flies for they are commonly found around and on flowers from which they get both energy-giving nectar and protein rich pollen.  The larvae are of the  rat-tailed type feeding on decaying sap under tree bark.

Distribution
Canada, United States.

References

Eristalinae
Insects described in 1872
Diptera of North America

Hoverflies of North America
Taxa named by Hermann Loew